Motown: A Journey Through Hitsville USA is the tenth studio album by Boyz II Men. It was released on November 13, 2007 by Decca Records. The album was produced by American Idol's Randy Jackson and Boyz II Men. David Simone and Winston Simone were Executive Producers for the album. The album is a tribute to some of Motown's classic songs, including "Just My Imagination" by The Temptations, "The Tracks of My Tears" by The Miracles and "Reach Out I'll Be There" by The Four Tops. The first single off the album is "The Tracks of My Tears".

Reception

The album debuted at #8 in the UK Albums Chart. On the US Billboard 200 chart, it debuted at #27, selling about 42,000 copies in its first week. The album received two nominations for the 51st Annual Grammy Awards (Best R&B Album and Best R&B Performance By A Duo Or Group With Vocals for 'Ribbon In The Sky'.)

Vibe writes: "The trio's confident take on DeBarge's timeless 'All This Love' proves the song deserves a place next to its more celebrated counterparts... Their lush signature harmonies remain intact."

Track listing

International edition
 "Just My Imagination (Running Away with Me)" (The Temptations)
 "It's the Same Old Song/Reach Out I'll Be There" (The Four Tops)
 "Mercy Mercy Me (The Ecology)" (Marvin Gaye)
 "The Tracks of My Tears" (The Miracles)
 "Money (That's What I Want)" (Barrett Strong)
 "Easy" (The Commodores)
 "I Was Made to Love Her" (Stevie Wonder)
 "All This Love" (DeBarge)
 "Ribbon in the Sky" (Acapella) (Stevie Wonder)
 "Ain't Nothing Like the Real Thing" (featuring Patti LaBelle) (Marvin Gaye & Tammi Terrell)
 "Got to Be There" (Michael Jackson)
 "War" (Edwin Starr)
 "End of the Road" (Acapella) (featuring Brian McKnight) (Boyz II Men)
 "There'll Never Be" (International Bonus Track) (Switch)

2008 Japan tour edition
 "Just My Imagination (Running Away with Me)" (The Temptations)
 "It's the Same Old Song/Reach Out I'll Be There" (The Four Tops)
 "Mercy Mercy Me (The Ecology)" (Marvin Gaye)
 "The Tracks of My Tears" (The Miracles)
 "Money (That's What I Want)" (Barrett Strong)
 "Easy" (The Commodores)
 "I Was Made to Love Her" (Stevie Wonder)
 "All This Love" (DeBarge)
 "Ribbon in the Sky" (Acapella) (Stevie Wonder)
 "Ain't Nothing Like the Real Thing" (featuring Patti LaBelle) (Marvin Gaye & Tammi Terrell)
 "There'll Never Be"
 "Got To Be There"
 "War"
 "End of the Road" (Acapella) (featuring Brian McKnight)
 "Just My Imagination (Running Away With Me)" (Acoustic)
 "Mercy Mercy Me (The Ecology)" (Acoustic)
 "Easy" (Acoustic)

Charts

Weekly charts

Year-end charts

Certifications

Single chart positions

References

External links
  (European version)
  / VEVO official channel
  / VEVO official channel
 

2007 albums
Covers albums
Boyz II Men albums
Decca Records albums
Albums produced by Brian McKnight
Motown cover albums